Dianne Wolfer (born 1961) is an Australian children's author who lives on the south coast of Western Australia. Her latest title, ‘Munjed Al Muderis - From Refugee to Surgical Inventor’ is Book Three of Aussie STEM Stars by Wild Dingo Press.

An earlier title Lighthouse Girl won the 2010 West Australian Young Readers' Book Award for Picture Books, and was shortlisted for the 2009 New South Wales Premier's History Awards. It is based on the true story of Fay Howe, daughter of the Breaksea Island lighthouse keeper, who relayed messages for the departing ANZAC troops in 1914. Lighthouse Girl was part inspiration for the Royal de Luxe The Giants story at the 2015 Perth International Arts Festival and has been adapted for stage by Black Swan Theatre. In 2018 Black Swan Theatre's production toured regional Western Australia.

Partner title,Light Horse Boy won the Children's Book Category of the 2014 Western Australian Premier's Book Awards, was shortlisted and awarded Honour Book for the 2014 Children's Book Council of Australia Awards.
A third title, In the Lamplight was published in 2018 and launched in Western Australia and Harefield, UK. This title completes Wolfer's Light series.

Wolfer's first picture book Photographs in the Mud was inspired by a research trip along the Kokoda Track and is used as a reference for international workshops promoting peaceful "Discourse Analysis". It has been published in Japanese.

Her second picture book Granny Grommet and Me was shortlisted for the 2014 Children's Book Council of Australia Awards.
Nanna's Button Tin, Wolfer's latest picture book was published by Walker Books Australia in 2017 and republished by Candlewick Press in 2018.

Wolfer completed PhD research at the University of Western Australia in 2017, with a focus on anthropomorphism and Crafting Animal Characters in Australian Children's Literature. Two novels for young adult (YA) readers were created as part of this study; The Shark Caller and The Dog with Seven Names, both published by Penguin Random House. "The Shark Caller" was shortlisted for the 2016 West Australian Young Readers' Book Awards and was a 2017 Children's Book Council of Australia (CBCA) Notable book. 'The Dog with Seven Names' was shortlisted for the 2019 NSW Premier's Literary Awards.

An earlier YA title, Choices was commended for the Family Therapists Children's Literature Award and is also published in Polish.

From 2006 to 2012 Wolfer was the Western Australian Advisor for the Society of Children's Book Writers and Illustrators (SCBWI).

Books
 Nanna's Button Tin (2018) Candlewick Press 
 The Dog with Seven Names (2018) Penguin Random House 
 In the Lamplight (2018) Fremantle Press 
 Nanna's Button Tin (2017) Walker Books Australia
 The Shark Caller (2016) Penguin Random House, 
 Annie's Snails (2014)
 Granny Grommet and Me (2013)
 Light Horse Boy (2013)
 Lighthouse Girl (2009)
 The Kid Whose Mum Kept Possums in Her Bra (2006)
 Photographs in the Mud (2005)
 Horse Mad (2005)
 Scuba Kid (2004)
 Iron Kid (2003)
 Being Billy (2003)
 Jungle Trek (2003)
 Butterfly Notes (2002)
 Choices (2001)
 Being Billy (2003)
 Jungle Trek (2003)
 Border Line (1998)
 Dolphin Song (1995)
Munjed al Muderis 2019

References

External links
 Dianne Wolfer's Home Page

1961 births
Australian children's writers
Writers from Western Australia
Living people
Australian women children's writers